Canonization is the process of declaring saints.

Canonization may also refer to:
Canonization of scripture, introducing a Biblical canon
A literary canon, such as the Western canon
"The Canonization", a poem by John Donne
Another term for canonicalization, the finding a canonical form

See also 
 Canon (disambiguation)